The Rural Municipality of McLeod No. 185 is a rural municipality (RM) in the Canadian province of Saskatchewan within Census Division No. 5 and  Division No. 1. It is located in the southeast portion of the province.

History 
The RM of McLeod No. 185 incorporated as a rural municipality on January 1, 1913.

Heritage properties
There are three historical buildings located within the RM.
Pheasant Forks Heritage Site - In Pheasant Forks the site consists of a school and a church.  The church (originally called the Zion Methodist Church or Pheasant Forks Church) was constructed in 1905 by Primitive Methodist Colonists and remained in service until 1963.  The four room school was constructed in 1920.
Weissenberg School - Constructed in 1900 the one room school was the first separate (Catholic public school) in Saskatchewan.  The school remained in service until 1964.  It was originally called the Weissenberg Roman Catholic Public School; Weissenberg Separate School; and eventually the Weissenberg Teacherage.
Zion Lutheran Church - Constructed in 1892, the church remained in active service until June 1964.  Since that time a historical service is held each June.

Demographics 

Government 
The RM of McLeod No. 185 is governed by an elected municipal council and an appointed administrator that meets on the second Wednesday of every month. The reeve of the RM is Clifford Allen  while its administrator is Tara Harris. The RM's office is located in Neudorf.

Transportation 
Lemberg Airport is located within the rural municipality.

References 

M
McLeod No. 185, Saskatchewan

Rural mu